"A Good Man" is a song written by Victoria Shaw, Keith Follesé and Adrienne Follesé, and recorded by Canadian country music band Emerson Drive.  It was released in March 2006 as the first single from their album Countrified.  The song reached the Top 20 on the U.S. Billboard Hot Country Songs chart in 2006, peaking at number 17.

Content
The narrator is a man reflecting on what he wants people to think of him after he dies.

Music video
The music video was directed by Steven Goldmann, and premiered on CMT in the summer of 2006. It was filmed primarily at Hoffmeyer's Mill in Sebringville, Ontario, Canada.

Personnel
Brad Mates - lead vocals
Danick Dupelle - acoustic guitar, electric guitar, backing vocals
Mike Melancon - drums
Patrick Bourque - bass guitar, backing vocals
Dale Wallace - keyboards, backing vocals
David Pichette - fiddle

Charts

References

2006 singles
Emerson Drive songs
Songs written by Victoria Shaw (singer)
Music videos directed by Steven Goldmann
Songs written by Keith Follesé
Song recordings produced by Josh Leo
Midas Records Nashville singles
2006 songs